Abdul Aziz Al-Obaidly (born 28 September 2001) is a Qatari swimmer. He competed in the men's 200 metre breaststroke at the 2020 Summer Olympics.

References

External links
 

2001 births
Living people
Qatari male swimmers
Olympic swimmers of Qatar
Swimmers at the 2020 Summer Olympics
Asian Games competitors for Qatar
Swimmers at the 2018 Asian Games
People from Doha